St. Francis Xavier Seminary is a Roman Catholic major seminary in Yuhannabad, near Lahore, Pakistan. It is an institute of philosophical studies serving the whole country. It offers a two-year program in Christian philosophy. It is affiliated to the Pontifical Urban University of Rome.

History
The Catholic Bishops' Conference of Pakistan decided on 18 April 1990 to build this new seminary for philosophical studies in the Roman Catholic Archdiocese of Lahore. The first group of seminarians joined on 1 September 1994.

On December 2, 1994, the new building was opened by Cardinal Jozef Tomko, special envoy of the Vatican to Pakistan.

Physical facilities
The physical structure consists of three blocks. One block houses the administration, staff residence, lecture rooms and library. Another block is the residence of the seminarians comprising dormitories, a common room, a small store, bathroom facilities and a room for the moderator of the group.

The third block houses the chapel, the dining room, the kitchen, the pantry, the kitchen store, the main store and a multipurpose hall used as a recreation hall by the seminarians. It is also used as a theatre for film shows and drama, not only for the seminarians but also for the people of the area. It is also used as an assembly hall.

The building is surrounded by a fairly large piece of land, which is being developed as a wheat and rice field also a vegetable garden; a small recreational spot, which includes a football ground, a basketball court and a Marian shrine.

Current events
The first two years are spent in St Francis Xavier Seminary for the study of Philosophy. The Seminary teaches philosophy subjects like Greek, Ancient,  Medieval, Modern, Western, Eastern and Islamic Philosophy in four semesters. English is the medium of instruction. Students who satisfy the study criteria are awarded the Diploma in Philosophy.

The seminary is also host to the St Francis Xavier School, built inside the seminary compound for the children of the poor, where the seminarians also teach catechism and English.

On 23 April 1999, the Seminary was officially affiliated with the Faculty of Philosophy of the Pontifical Urban University of Rome, which enabled it to award the degree of Baccalaureate in Philosophy. In 2008, 16 students wrote the B Ph examination of the Pontifical Urbaniana University and were awarded degrees.

In 2005 there were 25 seminarians.

In June 2011 the seminary had to increase its annual budget for its 52 seminarians from 250,000 rupees to 400,000 rupees because of expected price rises after a disappointing national budget.

In May 2020 the seminary received financial assistance from the charity Aid to the Church in Need to cope with problems created by COVID-19.

Rectors
 Father Bernard Mangion MSSP, 1994-1997
 Father Ranjit SJ, 1998-2005
 Fr. Khalid Yusaf, 2005-2012
 Fr. Asif John, 2012-2018
 Fr. Almas Daniel Archangelus, 2018 -

See also
 List of Jesuit sites

References

¬

Catholic seminaries in Pakistan
Educational institutions established in 1994
1994 establishments in Pakistan
Education in Lahore